Brandon Viret (born Vincent Brandon Viret on 4 July 1988) is a South African cricketer. He is a right-handed batsman and left-arm medium-fast bowler who plays for Eastern Province. He was born in Cape Town.

Viret made his first-class debut for the side during the 2009-10 season, against Gauteng. In the first innings in which he bowled, he took two wickets.

References

External links

1988 births
Living people
South African cricketers
Eastern Province cricketers
Namibia cricketers